Poecilus baeticus is a species of ground beetle in the family Carabidae. It is found in Spain and Morocco.

Subspecies
These two subspecies belong to the species Poecilus baeticus:
 Poecilus baeticus baeticus Rambur, 1838  (Spain)
 Poecilus baeticus gharbensis (Alluaud, 1927)  (Morocco)

References

Beetles described in 1837
Endemic fauna of Spain
Beetles of Europe
Taxa named by Jules Pierre Rambur
Pterostichinae